Hartge is a surname. Notable people with the name include:

 Charles E. Hartge (1865–1918), American architect
 Ethaline Hartge Cortelyou (1909–1997), American chemist and scientific technical writer
 Patricia Hartge, American cancer epidemiologist

See also 

 Hartge, German car tuning company